The 2014 Sheikh Jassim Cup will be the 36th edition of the cup competition for football teams from Qatar. It has now changed from a group staged pre-season tournament featuring all Qatari Stars League sides, to a one-off match between the previous seasons Qatar Stars League winners and Emir of Qatar Cup winners.

Newly built Abdullah bin Khalifa Stadium – the home base of Lekhwiya – will host the Sheikh Jassim Cup final between Al Sadd and Lekhwiya.

Match details

References

2014
2014–15 in Qatari football
2014 domestic association football cups
Al Sadd SC matches